Dimethylamidophosphoric dicyanide is an important chemical for the final process of synthesizing Tabun, a nerve agent used as a chemical weapon.

Preparation
Dimethylamidophosphoric dicyanide could be prepared by reacting Dimethylamidophosphoric dichloride with sodium cyanide.

Safety 
This chemical is very flammable, highly toxic, and reactive. If ingested or absorbed through skin, it will cause mild nerve agent symptoms directly as well as blood agent symptoms due to release of HCN. If mixed with water, it gives off poisonous hydrogen cyanide fumes and dimethylamidophosphoric acid.

See also
 Organophosphate poisoning
 Hydrogen cyanide

References

Organophosphates
Nerve agent precursors
Cyano compounds